The 1947 Palestine Premier League was the third edition of the first tier in the Arab Palestinian football league system, organized by the APSF. The champion was Shabab al-Arab Haifa, defeating Islamic Sports Club Jaffa 5–1 in the final, which was played in Jerusalem and winning the trophy for the second time in a row. This was the last edition of the Palestine Premier League before the 1948 Arab–Israeli War.

References

Palestine Premier League
2